María Vaner (23 March 1935 – 21 July 2008) was an Argentine actress. She appeared in nearly 50 films and television shows between 1958 and 2008. The daughter of Pedro Aleandro, her sister was actress Norma Aleandro. She had two sons with Argentinian singer, songwriter, actor and director Leonardo Favio.

Selected filmography
 The Kidnapper (1958)
 The Old Young People (1962)
 Me First (1964)
 Chronicle of a Boy Alone (1965)
 El Caradura y la millonaria (1971)
 The Bad Life (1973)
 La Raulito (1975)
 Kargus (1981)
 Adiós, Roberto (1985)

References

External links

1935 births
2008 deaths
Argentine film actresses
Actresses from Madrid
Spanish emigrants to Argentina
20th-century Argentine actresses
Burials at La Chacarita Cemetery